Gita Luka (September 5, 1921 – August 22, 2001) was an Israeli actress, comedian and singer.

Biography
Born in Romania, Luka had an impoverished childhood in a Jewish ghetto. She began attending and participating in Yiddish theatre groups when she reached her early 20s. In 1948, Luka and her family emigrated to Israel after surviving the Holocaust and made her career debut as a singer at the beginning of the War of Independence. Aside from performing songs in Hebrew, Luka also performed in Yiddish and Romanian.

Luka performed frequently as a singer in satire sketches at the Li-La-Lo Theatre and she starred in numerous musical adaptations of plays such as Heidi in 1969. She also made appearances at the Habima Theatre as well as at Hasimta Theatre and the Haifa Theatre. On screen, Luka participated in films such as Kazablan, One Pound Only and The Flying Matchmaker.

In 1988, Luka suffered a minor stroke and another one in 1995, which slowed down her ability to perform and eventually forced her to retire. She also underwent financial problems during the 1983 Israel bank stock crisis. Family friends of Luka organised a fundraiser to support her nursing home expenses. She was also financially supported by the Israeli Artists Association.

Personal life
Luka married two times. From her first husband, she had one daughter, Rachel. She also had four grandchildren.

Death
Luka died following a stroke in Netanya on August 22, 2001 nearly two weeks before her 80th birthday. She was interred at Yarkon Cemetery.

References

External links

1921 births
2001 deaths
Romanian emigrants to Israel
Israeli people of Romanian-Jewish descent
Jewish Israeli actresses
Jewish Israeli musicians
Jewish Israeli comedians
Romanian Jews in Israel
Nazi-era ghetto inmates
Israeli stage actresses
Israeli television actresses
Israeli film actresses
Israeli musical theatre actresses
20th-century Israeli women singers
Israeli female comedians
Yiddish theatre performers
20th-century Israeli actresses
20th-century Israeli comedians
Burials at Yarkon Cemetery